Zogbo is a surname. Notable people with the surname include:

 Aristide Zogbo (born 1981), Ivorian footballer
 Séverin Tapé Zogbo, Ivorian footballer

See also
 Zogba
 Zogby (disambiguation)

Surnames of African origin